Tammie Thornton (born 5 January 1976) is an Australian former soccer player who played for Australia 19 times in 1996 and 1997.

References

1976 births
Australian women's soccer players
Australia women's international soccer players
Living people
Women's association footballers not categorized by position